Since the introduction of economic reforms in 1978, China has become one of the world's fastest-growing major economies. , it was the world's second-largest economy by nominal GDP and largest by purchasing power parity (PPP). China was also the world's largest exporter and second-largest importer of goods. China is a member of numerous formal and informal multilateral organizations, including the WTO, APEC, BRICS, the Shanghai Cooperation Organisation (SCO), the BCIM and the G-20.

A company incorporated in any of China's special administrative regions is not considered to be incorporated in China. See the corresponding list for companies incorporated in China's special administrative regions. For further information on the types of business entities in this country and their abbreviations, see "Business entities in China".

Largest firms 

This list shows firms in the Fortune Global 500, which ranks firms by total revenues reported before 31 March 2018. Only the top five firms (if available) are included as a sample.

Notable firms 
This list includes notable companies with primary headquarters located in the country. The industry and sector follow the Industry Classification Benchmark taxonomy. Organizations which have ceased operations are included and noted as defunct.

See also 
 List of public corporations by market capitalization
 List of telephone operating companies
 List of companies of Hong Kong
 List of companies of Macau
 List of largest Chinese companies

References 

 

China